Virgil Weigel (February 25, 1953) is Democratic member of the Kansas House of Representatives, representing the 56th district (Topeka, Kansas in Shawnee County, Kansas).

References

External links
State Page
Ballotpedia

Democratic Party members of the Kansas House of Representatives
Living people
21st-century American politicians
1953 births